David Martin (born March 23, 1950) is a lawyer by training and a retired federal public servant. He is now a full-time writer of short humour and political satire, and from 2010 to 2012 had a bi-weekly humour column in The Ottawa Citizen. Martin has been writing op-ed pieces and humorous essays for more than 25 years and his work has appeared on the op-ed pages of most major North American daily newspapers including The New York Times, The Washington Post, the Chicago Tribune, the Los Angeles Times, and The Globe and Mail. His work has also appeared in magazines such as Newsweek and Smithsonian Magazine. He is also the author of My Friend W, a collection of his political satire published in 2005 by Arriviste Press.

David Martin lives in Ottawa, Ontario with his wife Cheryl.

Bibliography
My Friend W (2005) 
Dare to be Average (2010) 
Screams & Whispers (2013) 
King Donald I (2016)

References

External links
Dave's Political Satire - author's blog

Canadian humorists
1950 births
Living people